McKittrick Canyon is a scenic canyon within the Guadalupe Mountains of West Texas and Eddy County, New Mexico.  The steep, towering walls of McKittrick Canyon protect a rich riparian oasis in the midst of the Chihuahuan Desert.
 
The majority of McKittrick Canyon is part of Guadalupe Mountains National Park, but is separated from the main park area and managed as a day-use only area with limited visitation hours. A large part of North McKittrick Canyon, though,  is located in the Guadalupe Ranger District of Lincoln National Forest in New Mexico. Access to McKittrick Canyon is by a 4.2-mile (6.8-km) gated side road that leads to the mouth of McKittrick Canyon from U.S. Route 62/180.  Here, the National Park Service maintains a parking area, restroom facilities, and visitor center, which is staffed most of the year by volunteers.

McKittrick Canyon Trail
McKittrick Canyon Trail begins at the visitor center and initially follows a dry stream, crossing the stream bed several times as it works its way up the canyon.  At first, the vegetation is more typical of the Chihuahuan Desert with various species of yucca, agave, and cacti, such as Spanish dagger (Yucca faxoniana), sotol (Dasylirion leiophyllum), ocotillo (Fouquieria splendens), lechuguilla (Agave lechuguilla), century plants (Agave americana), prickly pear (Opuntia spp.), and claret cup cacti (Echinocereus triglochidiatus).  Scattered among these desert plants are a few hardy pines, junipers, and the occasional Texas madrone (Arbutus xalapensis), an unusual tree with red-colored bark that tends to curl up and peel off each year.

As one ascends into the relatively cool and more sheltered environment farther up the canyon, a flowing stream of clear water appears and riparian vegetation becomes more abundant, including deciduous trees such as oak, ash, and bigtooth maple (Acer grandidentatum).  During the fall, McKittrick Canyon comes alive with color from the turning foliage of maple and hardwood trees.  The bright colors stand in stark contrast to the surrounding Chihuahuan Desert.

In 1959, Pratt donated  of his ranch to the National Park Service, and seven years later, on 15 October 1966, President Lyndon B. Johnson signed the act establishing Guadalupe Mountains National Park. On 30 September 1972, Guadalupe Mountains National Park was dedicated and formally opened to the public.

From this high point, one can view McKittrick Canyon and the distant desert to the east and South McKittrick Canyon to the west.

A portion of the canyon was listed on the National Register of Historic Places for its archeological importance on 26 September 1991.

See also

Carlsbad Caverns National Park
Delaware Basin
El Capitan (Texas)
Guadalupe Peak
Pecos River
Trans-Pecos
Van Horn, Texas

References

External links

Canyons and gorges of Texas
Protected areas of Texas
National Register of Historic Places in Guadalupe Mountains National Park
Archaeological sites on the National Register of Historic Places in Texas
Protected areas of Culberson County, Texas
Landforms of Culberson County, Texas
National Register of Historic Places in Culberson County, Texas
Protected areas of Eddy County, New Mexico
Landforms of Eddy County, New Mexico